The Premios Tu Mundo for Novela of the Year,  is a category created by Premios Tu Mundo, presented by Telemundo, In this category the best telenovela Telemundo is chosen. So far the only soap opera that has had 2 nominations has been El Señor de los Cielos.

Winners and nominees

Listed below are the winners of the award for each year, as well as the other nominees.

Novelas

Súper series

References 

Awards established in 2012
Soap opera awards